Isle of Wight County is a county located in the Hampton Roads region of the U.S. state of Virginia. It was named after the Isle of Wight, England, south of the Solent, from where many of its early colonists had come. As of the 2020 census, the population was 38,606. Its county seat is Isle of Wight, an unincorporated community.

Isle of Wight County is located in the Virginia Beach-Norfolk-Newport News, VA-NC Metropolitan Statistical Area. Its northeastern boundary is on the coast of Hampton Roads waterway.

Isle of Wight County features two incorporated towns, Smithfield and Windsor.  The first courthouse for the county was built in Smithfield in 1750.  The original courthouse and its associated tavern (The Smithfield Inn) are still standing.

As the county population developed, leaders thought they needed a county seat near the center of the area. They built a new courthouse near the center of the county in 1800.  The 1800 brick courthouse and its associated tavern (Boykin's Tavern) are still standing, as are the 1822 clerk's offices nearby. Some additions have been made. The 1800 courthouse is used daily, serving as the government chambers for the Board of Supervisors, as well as the meeting hall for the school board. The chambers are sometimes used as a court for civil trials if the new courthouse is fully in use.  The new courthouse opened in 2010; it is across the street from the sheriff's office and county offices complex.

History 
During the 17th century, shortly after establishment of the settlement at Jamestown in 1607, English settlers explored and began settling the areas adjacent to the large Hampton Roads waterway. Captain John Smith in 1608 crossed the James River and obtained fourteen bushels of corn from the  Native American inhabitants, the Warrosquyoack or Warraskoyak. They were a tribe of the Powhatan Confederacy, who had three villages in the area of modern Smithfield. English colonists drove the Warraskoyak from their villages in 1622 and 1627, as part of their reprisals for the Great Massacre of 1622, in which the Native Americans had decimated English settlements, hoping to drive them out of their territory.

The first English plantations along the south shore within present-day Isle of Wight were established by Puritan colonists, beginning with that of Christopher Lawne in May 1618, and Edward Bennett (colonist) in 1621.  Several members of the Puritan Bennett family also settled there, including Edward's nephew, Richard Bennett. He led the Puritans to neighboring Nansemond in 1635, and later was appointed as governor of the Virginia Colony.

By 1634, the entire Colony consisted of eight shires or counties with a total population of approximately 5,000 inhabitants. Warrosquyoake Shire was renamed in 1637 as Isle of Wight County, after the island off the south coast of England. The original name had come derived from the Native Americans of the area; it went through transliteration and Anglicisation, eventually becoming known as "Warwicke Squeake".

On October 20, 1673, the "Grand Assembly" at Jamestown authorized both Isle of Wight County and Lower Norfolk County to construct a fort.

St. Luke's Church, built in the 17th century, is Virginia's oldest church building.  In the late 20th century, it was designated as a National Historic Landmark in recognition of its significance. Many landmark and contributing structures on the National Register are located in Smithfield including the Wentworth-Grinnan House.

In 1732 a considerable portion of the northwestern part of the original shire was added to Brunswick County, and in 1748 the entire county of Southampton was carved out of it.

During the American Civil War, Company F of the 61st Virginia Infantry Regiment of the Confederate Army was called the "Isle of Wight Avengers."

Geography

The county is bounded by the James River on the north and the Blackwater River to the south.  The land is generally low-lying, with many swamps and pocosins.

Adjacent counties and independent cities
 Newport News, Virginia — northeast
 Suffolk, Virginia — southeast
 Southampton County — west
 Franklin, Virginia — southwest
 Surry County — northwest

Major highways

Demographics

2020 census

Note: the US Census treats Hispanic/Latino as an ethnic category. This table excludes Latinos from the racial categories and assigns them to a separate category. Hispanics/Latinos can be of any race.

2010 Census
As of the census of 2010, there were 35,270 people, 11,319 households, and 8,670 families residing in the county.  The population density was 94 people per square mile (36/km2).  There were 12,066 housing units at an average density of 38 per square mile (15/km2).  The racial makeup of the county was 71.8% White, 24.7% Black or African American, 0.4% Native American, 0.8% Asian, 0.0% Pacific Islander, 0.5% from other races, and 1.8% from two or more races.  1.9% of the population were Hispanic or Latino of any race.

There were 11,319 households, out of which 34.00% had children under the age of 18 living with them, 60.40% were married couples living together, 12.20% had a female householder with no husband present, and 23.40% were non-families. 20.00% of all households were made up of individuals, and 8.60% had someone living alone who was 65 years of age or older.  The average household size was 2.61 and the average family size was 2.99.

In the county, the population was spread out, with 25.40% under the age of 18, 6.60% from 18 to 24, 29.60% from 25 to 44, 26.20% from 45 to 64, and 12.20% who were 65 years of age or older.  The median age was 39 years. For every 100 females there were 95.70 males.  For every 100 females age 18 and over, there were 91.70 males.

The median income for a household in the county was $45,387, and the median income for a family was $52,597. Males had a median income of $37,853 versus $22,990 for females. The per capita income for the county was $20,235.  About 6.60% of families and 8.30% of the population were below the poverty line, including 8.80% of those under age 18 and 11.90% of those age 65 or over.

Government

Board of Supervisors
 D5: Don Rosie (I)
 D3: Rudolph Jefferson (I)
 D2: William McCarty (I)
 D1: Dick Grice (I)
 D4: Joel Acree (I)

Constitutional officers
 Clerk of the Circuit Court: Kathleen S. Torrence (I)
 Commissioner of the Revenue: Gerald H. Gwaltney (I)
 Commonwealth's Attorney: Georgette Phillips (I)
 Sheriff: James R. Clarke, Jr. (I)
 Treasurer: Judith Crocker Wells (I)

State and federal elected officials

House of Delegates:
 Emily Brewer (R-64)
 
Senate:
 Tommy Norment (R-3)
 John Cosgrove (Virginia politician) (R-14)
 L. Louise Lucas  (D-18)

U.S. House of Representatives:
 Bobby Scott (politician) (D-VA 3)

Public services 
Blackwater Regional Library is the regional library system that provides services to the citizens of Isle of Wight.

Communities

Towns
 Smithfield
 Windsor

Census-designated places
 Benns Church
 Camptown
 Carrollton
 Carrsville
 Rushmere

Other unincorporated communities

 Battery Park
 Burwell's Bay
 Central Hill
 Comet
 Indika
 Isle of Wight
 Lawson
 Mogart's Beach
 Pons
 Raynor
 Rescue
 Stott
 Walters
 Wills Corner
 Zuni

Gallery

See also
 National Register of Historic Places listings in Isle of Wight County, Virginia

References

External links
 Isle of Wight County Virginia official website
 Isle of Wight County Virginia Economic Development official website
 Hampton Roads Economic Development Alliance - serving Isle of Wight County

 
Virginia counties
1634 establishments in Virginia
Populated places established in 1634
Populated places on the James River (Virginia)
Populated places in colonial Virginia